Kerwin Frost (born July 26, 1995) is a Harlem-born entertainer, DJ, talk, show host, and comedian known for his eclectic street style. He first rose to prominence in New York City's Soho Youth streetwear scene and as the Founder of the Spaghetti Boys, a creative collective known for viral YouTube videos and streetwear collaborations. In 2019, Kerwin became Adidas' newest creator, responsible for designing clothing, sneakers and ad campaigns for the brand. He also began hosting a YouTube talk show, Kerwin Frost Talks.

Kerwin is recognizable by his trademark face tattoo of a pencil that runs the entire length of his right cheek which he has had since age 14.

Early life 
Kerwin was raised in public housing in Harlem, turning to fashion and music at a young age to escape from his humble surroundings. By economic necessity, his father first introduced him to thrifting, a pursuit Kerwin adopted with passion. Growing up, he would hunt for designer pieces at Goodwill, and swap them out with his friends.

Kerwin attended Martin Luther King Jr. High School and dropped out at 16.

Career

2015–2018: Soho Youth Streetwear Culture and the Spaghetti Boys 
At 15, Kerwin began spending time with other fashion-obsessed kids along the formerly called ‘clout corridor’, an area in Soho that stretched between Mercer and Howard Street, and included stores such as Supreme, VFiles, Off-White, NikeLab 21M, among others in early 2014. It was here that he met other likeminded friends, including Mike the Ruler, Luka Sabbat, and Austin Babbitt. To make money to purchase clothes, Kerwin would wait for hours in the Supreme line the night before major drops, and would then resell the clothes at a premium to New York tourists. When he was 16, he interned at VFiles. During this time, he made the decision to immerse himself in the fashion world, rather than be a fashion writer, something he had been contemplating.

In 2015, Kerwin founded the Spaghetti Boys, a NYC-based art-content producers-DJ collective, alongside Ray Martinez. The two met in one of Harlem's public housing developments where they were both living, and soon become friends at a local skate-spot. Spaghetti Boys became well known for their work in New York creating art, design, and music.  In 2015, the Spaghetti Boys collective released fashion collaborations with Off-White and Heron Preston, as well as promotional material for Nike Air.

The Spaghetti Boys also hosted free all-ages parties at New York City venues such as Milk Studios and Overthrow Boxing Gym. Honorary members of the Spaghetti Boys included Austin Babbitt, Sheck Wes, White Trash Tyler, among others. In late 2018, the Spaghetti Boys disbanded and Frost began focusing on new projects. Describing the Spaghetti Boys apparel, Frost has said, “We were kind of making the clothes for this suburban kid who had green spiked hair and listened to Green Day. But that kid didn't exist”.

2018–present: Entertainment career 
Kerwin has garnered attention for producing viral video content and securing unplanned interviews with recognized pop culture celebrities. In 2018, he worked with Kanye West to create three video content pieces for West: the West's Wyoming listening party, his Kids See Ghosts listening party, and the Kardashian-Jenner-West Christmas Party. Kerwin has also created and hosted a street trivia series for Cash App. From Los Angeles to New York, Frost interviewed people on the street surprising them with free money.

Kerwin is known for DJing fashion parties, including for brands Moncler, Palm Angels, and others. He is also known for DJing at celebrity events, notably the 2019 Kardashian-Jenner Christmas Party and the Weeknd's Birthday Party. In November, he was part of the lineup at Post Malone’s Posty Fest.

Kerwin Frost Talks 
In March 2019, Kerwin launched Season 1 of his self-produced and distributed talk show, Kerwin Frost Talks. In each episode he sits down for hours with A-list music and fashion celebrities for organic conversations. Kerwin describes the episodes as “spoken-word biographies from the horse’s mouth.” The interviews are shot for the most part directly in the guest's house, which gives the viewer an intimate look into their life and home. The 15-episode Season 1 featured guests including ASAP Rocky, Lil Yachty, SZA, Dev Hynes, Luka Sabbat, Jeremy Scott, the Founders of Hood by Air, Tyler the Creator, Chief Keef among others. ASAP Rocky held his first interview following after his stint in a Swedish jail on an episode of Kerwin Frost Talks, during which he openly talked about his falling out with Spaceghostpurpp. Lil Yachty broke the news on his episode of KFT that he wrote "Act Up" for City Girls.

Film and acting 
In March 2019, Kerwin hosted the first Annual Kerwin Frost Film Festival in New York City. 17 films were shown over three days. The festival featured a panel with film producers the Safdie Brothers, a Q&A session led by music video producer Cole Bennett, and an appearance by Robert Pattinson. The Film Festival was free and sponsored by Cash App.

Kerwin features in the Safdie Brother's film Uncut Gems, as himself.

Other ventures

Adidas partnership 
In January 2020, Kerwin announced a long-term partnership with Adidas, which includes him designing clothing, footwear and ad campaigns for the brand. In an interview with GQ, Frost mentions that he has wanted to work for Adidas for a long time. To date, he has developed limited edition cassette tapes for the brand, featured in their Superstar shoe campaign, and is expected to create a suite of apparel this year that leans heavily into his personal aesthetic and inspired by costume.

Style 
Kerwin is a street style influencer, famous for his thrifted avant-garde outfits, and being draped in street-fashion and high-fashion styles. He has been connected to popular street-wear brands including Palm Angels, Moncler, Off-White, Yeezy, and has a multi-year partnership with Adidas. His fashion choices have garnered media attention. Kerwin Frost donning a Hood by Air tent has been described as a classic embodiment of a 2019 street style trend known as ‘peak maximalism’.  At Paris Fashion Week 2019, he was featured in a Moncler x Craig Green coat that went viral. Other notable Paris Fashion Week looks include donning a pair of Luar angel wings at the Kim Jones Pre-fall 2019 collection and Dior FY19 show, and wearing head-to-toe Yeezy outfits. Other notable looks include Hood by Air's double-sided cowboy boots and he is frequently seen is oversized hats. Artist Takashi Murakami has co-signed Kerwin's fashion choices and Teezo Touchdown cited Kerwin as his fashion hero.

When asked to describe the roots of his personal style, Kerwin has said, “Most people in today’s time follow about five different cookie-cutter formats of style. I grew up thrifting because my family was poor, which opened up worlds of imagination. This doesn’t just apply to vintage—the diversity of thrift store options had me wearing a ski-boot or a scuba suit on a normal day. I grew up with the rule book in the garbage which gave me a lot of freedom to wear what I genuinely thought looked cool, not what was fed to me by popular media.”

Personal life 
Kerwin is married to Erin Yogasundram, who was also his manager, and helped build his career and brand. In July 2019, they welcomed their first child, Waffle Frost. Frost and Erin met over Instagram. 

In a recent interview with Coveteur, Kerwin has an extensive collection of vintage posters, ranging from Spice World to Chicken Run to Got Milk. Other notable items in his home include several life-size cutouts of himself, and a Nintendo 64 prototype that Frost built himself.

Filmography

Discography

Awards and nominations 
Nominated by Dazed for its annual Dazed 100 list.

Nominated for Best in Fashion in the 11th Annual Shorty Awards

References

American DJs
Living people
American male actors
1995 births